Bahut Hua Samman is a 2020 Indian Hindi-language comedy thriller film directed by Ashish R. Shukla. It was produced and bankrolled by Yoodlee films, the film division of Saregama. The film stars Raghav Juyal, Abhishek Chauhan, Sanjay Mishra, Ram Kapoor, Nidhi Singh, Namit Das and Flora Saini. It premiered on Disney+ Hotstar on 2 October 2020 and received positive reviews.

Plot 
The film starts with two men fighting over a car dent. In anger, one of them breaks the window of the other's car, and they fight in a humorously eccentric manner. The owner of the damaged car takes out a bag, and both of them leave the scene. Later, we learn that the two are Fundoo (Abhishek Chauhan) and Bony (Raghav Juyal), and that they staged this act together to steal the bag from the car without attracting suspicion. They sell the bag to Chandu, the college's con man.

Fundoo and Bonny failed their final year of mechanical engineering training and are unable to graduate. The college's graduates throw a party to celebrate their new jobs, and Fundoo and Bony attend this party. But they become envious and leave, and soon cross paths with Baba (Sanjay Mishra) who thinks of himself as a Robin Hood fighting the societal faults of capitalism with his comrades. Baba convinced them to rob a branch of the college bank and gives them a map of it. Specifically, Baba tells them to rob the locker room, which has cash and jewelry worth around 30,000,000 rupees (£299,700).

Fundoo and Bonny discuss various plans, but ultimately decide to rob the bank by entering through the water pipes below the locker room and using a machine to cut the room's steel flooring. They ask Chandu to give them some men to assist, and he provides them with Raju and Bhola. But after they make fun of Fundoo and Bonny, Fundoo and Bonny send them away and decide to execute the plan by themselves after all.

They ask Chandu to turn off the water supply for 24 hours under the guise of water conservation so that they can enter the locker room through the pipes safely. Baba instructs them to rob the locker of PMS (the college's dean, and also the professor who failed them) as he believes this locker has something valuable. Unfortunately, the water supply was only cut for 8 hours instead of 24, and when they are about to enter the locker room, the water starts flowing again. Nevertheless, they manage to enter the locker room, only to find that PMS is there with some police officers, and that several of the lockers are broken. The police arrest Fundoo and Bonny, who are then interrogated by officer Bobby (Nidhi Singh). We learn that Bobby is trying hard to have a child with her husband Rajat (Namit Das). Bobby tortures Fundoo and Bony using a machine consisting of pulleys and levers, which Bobby was able to set up because she was also a mechanical engineering student in the same college.

PMS informs Netaji about the robbery, explaining that his locker has been looted and the Kohinoor that was inside it is now gone. Netaji slaps PMS and the mood grows tense. Netaji then meets with Baba Ji of the company Akhand Bharat Sansthan. Baba Ji warns Netaji that if he suffers harm to his reputation, he will not let Netaji win the next election. Netaji promises him that he will find the Kohinoor, and he hires ex-commando Lovely Singh to help him.

The police ask Fundoo and Bonny to identify the robbers via security camera footage, and they identify Bhola and Raju. The police arrest Chandu, who earlier in the film introduced these two men to Fundoo and Bonny, but Chandu reveals that he doesn't know anything about the plot.

Meanwhile, Bholu and Raju call their boss Baalu Bhaiya. We learn that they had earlier caused a major financial loss to Baalu's business, and that they robbed the bank in order to pay back the loss and rebuild trust. Baalu Bhaiya asks them to meet him at Sapna's farmhouse (Sapna is the girlfriend of both Bholu and Raju). However, Baalu Bhaiya sends his men there to kill Bholu and Raju, and once they arrive, they capture Sapna and ask her about Bholu and Raju. Bholu and Raju overhear this conversation and try to save Sapna. In the midst of the shooting, Bholu and Raju drop the bag with the robbed items, Sapna picks it up, and they all flee.

Meanwhile, Lovely Singh is searching for the bag and questions Baalu Bhaiya, but when he does not get any information, he kills Baalu. Fundoo and Bony are released on bail with the help of Baba. Lovely reaches Sapna and checks the bag with the stolen items but doesn't find the Kohinoor. He asks her to call Raju and Bholu to set up a meeting, and they ask her to come back to the old farmhouse outside the village. The call was taped by the police. Lovely kills Sapna after learning all the information he wanted from her.

When Raju and Bhola arrive at the farmhouse, the police arrest them and put them in jail. At the jail, Baba asks for the whereabouts of the Kohinoor in exchange for telling them where Sapna is. They reveal to Baba that it is in the jeep near the farmhouse. Baba asks Fundoo and Bony to accompany him there. They at first refuse, but their eagerness for riches ultimately leads them to agree. Lovely overhears Baba's conversation with Raju and Bhola and gets to the farmhouse before them.

Lovely gets the bag and then tries to kill the two. Baba saves them but gets shot. Fundoo and Bony get the Kohinoor, which is a diary that describes how much money Akhand Bharat gave to the union minister as well as a chemical formula. They take the diary to Bobby, who questions PMS to learn that the chemical formula of for a substance that is put in all the products of Akhand Bharat Sansthan so that people get addicted to them. PMS reveals the location of the lab where this chemical is produced. Bobby had planned a vacation with Rajat to Manali to plan a baby, but cancels the trip and instead takes him to Gorakhpur to investigate Akhand Bharat Sansthan's lab. Before leaving, she finds Rajat's fertility report, which says that Rajat can never become a father. They learned the location of the lab in PMS's interrogation.

Meanwhile, we learn that Baba is alive; he decides to take revenge on Lovely and gets his weapons ready. As Bobby and our two protagonists enter the lab, Fundoo and Bony come under the influence of a toxic biochemical, lose their senses, and start to hallucinate. Lovely arrives, hoping to get the Kohinoor back, and tries to kill all three of them. But Baba arrives just in time to save them and kills Lovely, thus achieving his revenge. Seeing Baba's heroic act, Bobby decides to make him her sperm donor for in vitro fertilization. A few days later, Akhand Bharat Sansthan's wicked deeds are exposed and Babaji is sent to jail. When Baba asks Fundoo and Bony about their future plans, they reveal that they made a fortune by short-selling shares of Akhand Bharat, and now they are wealthy. Bobby soon delivers a baby girl. The movie ends with Baba, Fundoo, and Bony relaxing in a pool.

Cast 
 Sanjay Mishra as Ram Prasad aka Bakch*d Baba
 Raghav Juyal as Bony
 Abhishek Chauhan as Fundoo
 Ram Kapoor as Lovely Singh
 Nidhi Singh as Bobby Tiwari
 Namit Das as Rajat Tiwari
 Flora Saini as Sapna Rani
 Sharat Sonu as Bhola
 Bhupesh Singh as Raju

Release 
The film released on Disney+ Hotstar on 2 October 2020.

Soundtrack 

The music is composed by Ankit Uppal and Mannan Munjal and released on Saregama label.

References

External links 
 

2020s Hindi-language films
Disney+ Hotstar original films
Indian comedy films
Hindi-language comedy films
2020 direct-to-video films
2020 films
2020 comedy films